The China Railway HXN3 (EMD classification JT56ACe) is a 6000 horsepower (4.5 MW) diesel-electric locomotive designed by Electro-Motive Diesel in the United States for export to China. All JT56ACe locomotives use AC traction motor technology and use the EMD H-Engine as their prime mover. The locomotives are capable of meeting the EPA's Tier 2 emissions regulations.

In September 2005, the People's Republic of China announced an order for 300 JT56ACe locomotives. The locomotives were jointly manufactured by EMD and China's own Dalian Locomotive Works. They are dual cab locomotives.

Number 0301 - 0330 are single cab locomotives. They are coupled back to back and used on Tibet line.

Number 7001 - 7004 are delivered to Shenhua Mining Group.

The locomotive has been deployed to Qinghai–Tibet railway in 2018.

See also
 Electro-Motive Diesel
 EMD SD90MAC
 EMD 265

References

 
 CNR Corp. Spec Page

External links

Co-Co locomotives
CRRC Dalian locomotives
HXN3
JT56ACe
Railway locomotives introduced in 2008
Standard gauge locomotives of China